Man  is a village in Phagwara Tehsil in Kapurthala district of Punjab State, India. The village is administrated by a Sarpanch who is an elected representative.

Nearby cities include Phagwara, Jandiala, JalandharPandhillaur.

Transport 
Rail: Close to the village are Phagwara Junction and Mauli Halt railway stations. Jalandhar City railway station is 23 km away from Man.

Air: The nearest airport is Ludhiana Airport, 40 km distant in the city of Ludhiana. Sri Guru Ram Dass Jee International Airport is 118 km away, located in Amritsar.

References

External links
  Villages in Kapurthala
 Kapurthala Villages List

Villages in Kapurthala district